was a railway station on the Shinetsu Main Line in Jōetsu, Niigata, Japan, operated by East Japan Railway Company (JR East). It closed in 2014, replaced by the nearby Jōetsumyōkō Station.

Lines
Wakinoda Station was served by the Shinetsu Main Line. A new interchange station called Jōetsumyōkō Station was built close by, and this replaced Wakinoda Station when the Hokuriku Shinkansen opened in March 2015.

Station layout
The station had a single ground-level island platform serving two tracks.

Platforms

Adjacent stations

History

Wakinoda Station opened on 15 August 1921. With the privatization of JNR on 1 April 1987, the station came under the control of JR East.

From 19 October 2014, the station building and platforms were closed, and the station functions moved to the nearby structure, and became Jōetsumyōkō Station from 14 March 2015 when the Hokuriku Shinkansen opened for service.

Passenger statistics
In fiscal 2013, the station was used by an average of 139 passengers daily (boarding passengers only). The passenger figures for previous years are as shown below.

References

External links
 JR East Wakinoda Station 

Shin'etsu Main Line
Stations of East Japan Railway Company
Railway stations in Niigata Prefecture
Railway stations in Japan opened in 1921
Railway stations closed in 2014